The Natisone is a  river in Slovenia and Italy. It flows for some time as a border river between Slovenia and Italy, continues in Slovenia and then crosses the border and continues in Eastern Friuli, in northeastern Italy. It is the main tributary of the Torre and a sub-affluent of the Isonzo. It has a pluvio-nival regime and belongs to the Adriatic Sea Basin.

Before the confluence with the Torre, it passes through the communes of Pulfero and Cividale del Friuli.

References

External links
 
 Condition of Nadiža - graphs, in the following order, of water level, flow and temperature data for the past 30 days (taken in Potoki by ARSO)

Rivers of Friuli-Venezia Giulia
Rivers of the Province of Udine
Rivers of the Slovene Littoral
Italy–Slovenia border
Border rivers
International rivers of Europe
Natura 2000 in Slovenia
Rivers of Italy